Alexandru Nicușor Raicea (born 17 December 1996) is a Romanian professional footballer who plays as a midfielder for Liga I side FC U Craiova 1948. In his career, Raicea also played for CS Podari.

Honours
FC U Craiova
Liga II: 2020–21
Liga III: 2019–20
Liga IV: 2017–18

References

External links
 

1996 births
Living people
Sportspeople from Craiova
Romanian footballers
Association football midfielders
Liga I players
Liga II players
Liga III players
FC U Craiova 1948 players
CS Mioveni players
CSC 1599 Șelimbăr players